Kokkothamangalam is a census town in Alappuzha district in the Indian state of Kerala.

Demographics
 India census, Kokkothamangalam had a population of 16,853. Males constitute 49% of the population and females 51%. Kokkothamangalam has an average literacy rate of 85%, higher than the national average of 59.5%: male literacy is 88%, and female literacy is 82%. In Kokkothamangalam, 10% of the population is under 6 years of age.

Certain part of this village comes under the Cherthala and the rest under Mararikulam in the Kerala Assembly constituency partition.

References

Cities and towns in Alappuzha district